The 2017 Sydney Women's Sevens was the second tournament of the 2016–17 World Rugby Women's Sevens Series. It was the inaugural edition of the Australian Women's Sevens and part of the World Rugby Women's Sevens Series.

The tournament was played on 3–4 February 2017 at Allianz Stadium and Kippax Field in Sydney, and won by Canada 21–17 over the United States in the final.

Format
The teams were drawn into three pools of four teams each. Each team played every other team in their pool once. The top two teams from each pool advanced to the Cup brackets, together with the two best third-placed teams. The other teams from each group played off for the Challenge Trophy.

Teams
The participating teams were:

Pool stage

Pool A

Pool B

Pool C

Knockout stage

Challenge Trophy

5th place

Cup

Tournament placings

Source: World Rugby (archived)

See also
 World Rugby Women's Sevens Series
 2016–17 World Rugby Women's Sevens Series
 2017 Sydney Sevens

References

2017
2016–17 World Rugby Women's Sevens Series
2017 in Australian women's sport
2017 in women's rugby union
2017 in Australian rugby union